Aidan O'Shea may refer to:

 Aidan O'Shea (Kerry Gaelic footballer), son of Jack O'Shea
 Aidan O'Shea (Mayo Gaelic footballer)

See also
Jay Bradley (born 1980), American professional wrestler also known as Aiden O'Shea